Donald McKinlay (25 July 1891 – 16 September 1959) was a Scottish footballer who played as a left back. He spent most of his career with Liverpool, winning the Football League title twice in the early 1920s.

Early career
Born in the hamlet of Boghall and raised in the mining village of Newton in Lanarkshire, McKinlay played local football with Newton Swifts, Rutherglen Woodburn and Newton Villa.

Liverpool
He joined Liverpool in January 1910. The goalkeeper Kenny Campbell (a childhood acquaintance) credited McKinlay's assistance during his early days at Anfield. He captained the club from January 1922 to 1928, and made 434 appearances for the club, including 393 in the league. Liverpool were league champions two years in succession in 1921–22 and 1922–23 in the first two seasons of his captaincy.

He also made two appearances for the Scottish national team in 1922.

Later years
He finished his career with nearby Prescot Cables, and later became a publican in Liverpool.

References

1891 births
1959 deaths
People from Baillieston
Sportspeople from Cambuslang
Scottish footballers
Scotland international footballers
Liverpool F.C. players
Prescot Cables F.C. players
English Football League players
Association football fullbacks
Scottish Junior Football Association players
Place of death missing

FA Cup Final players
Footballers from South Lanarkshire